The Sokanu Interests, Personality, and Preferences Inventory (SIPPI) is a psychological inventory used in career counseling and employee selection. Scales are based on O*Net content domains developed by the US Department of Labor, with the addition of basic interest scales based on the model developed by Day and Rounds. The inventory measures 186 user traits across 8 domains: personality, needs, skills preferences, abilities preferences, work context, organizational culture, Holland Codes, and basic interests. Completing the full set of available materials (510 items) takes an average of 35.4 minutes.

Domains and Scales

History

First published in October 2013, the SIPPI was developed by Rhys Lewis, Ph.D. and published by Sokanu Interactive. An early version of scales for Holland Codes and Basic interests used items published by the open source Interest Item Pool project. Computer adaptive versions of the personality and interest scales are currently under development. Validation studies are currently being conducted to establish concurrent validity with other popular assessments and job behaviors.

Reliability

Average internal consistency reliability of the multi-item scales on SIPPI is α = .88. Minimum internal consistency for any scale is α = .82.

References

Personality tests